Les Carr (22 May 1929 – 11 May 2012) was a former Australian rules footballer who played with Carlton in the Victorian Football League (VFL).

Notes

External links 

Les Carr's profile at Blueseum

1929 births
2012 deaths
Carlton Football Club players
Australian rules footballers from Victoria (Australia)